Kron is a 2019 Malaysian Malay-language mystery drama film directed by Opie Zami. The film follows a history team expedition on tracing back the ancient King's path, a passage used by King of Siam during the 1800s, but things go wrong when the team are hunted by a creature named Kron. 

It is released on 22 August 2019 in Malaysia and Brunei.

Synopsis
Professor Daud, a historian at the Kedah Museum, is researching and keeping track of the King's Path, a route used by the King of Siam to transport the gold and silver flowers sent by Sultan Kedah back to Siam between 1803 and 1910. Professor Daud has four stages of cancer. Daud and his assistant Sham are banned by their superiors from carrying out the mission for safety concern. But they get the chance to do so when an entrepreneur Melur Seri and paranormal TV producer Pian offers to sponsor the trip. Daud's another objective of the trip is to find out why his wife disappeared on their previous trip.

What starts off as a smooth expedition takes a dark turn when they are lost in the jungle and are now being hunted by a mysterious creature called Kron.

Cast 
Zahiril Adzim as Sham
Dayana Roza as Melur Seri
Aman Graseka as Professor Daud
Opie Zami as Ketoi
Mohamad Ikhtiarudin as 
Bohari Ibrahim as Tok Batin
Ruminah Sidek as Nenek Suri
Ellie Suriati as Bonoh Iring 
Cat Farish as Dr. Hamid
Ahmad Idham as Professor Amri 
Johara Ayob as Professor Mariana
Syazwan Zulkifly as Arwan

References

External links 
 Kron on Cinema.com.my
 Kron on Popcorn Malaysia

2019 films